Satvya Mulichi Satavi Mulgi is an Indian Marathi language television series directed by Vidyadhar Pathare under the banner of Iris Production. It is airing on Zee Marathi by replacing Devmanus 2. It stars Titiksha Tawade and Ajinkya Nanaware in lead roles. It is an official remake of Bengali TV series Trinayani.

Cast

Main 
 Titeeksha Tawade as Netra Kulkarni
 Ajinkya Nanaware as Adwait Shekhar Rajadhyaksh

Recurring 
Netra's family
 Jayant Ghate as Bhalchandra Kulkarni
 Sakshi Paranjape as Mangala Kulkarni
 Pranita Acharekar as Hema Kulkarni

Adwait's family
 Rahul Mehendale as Shekhar Padmakar Rajadhyaksh
 Aishwarya Narkar as Rupali Shekhar Rajadhyaksh
 Mugdha Godbole-Ranade as Mamata Shekhar Rajadhyaksh
 Rajani Welankar as Padmaja Padmakar Rajadhyaksh
 Vivek Joshi as Padmakar Rajadhyaksh
 Amruta Raorane as Ketaki Kedar Rajadhyaksh
 Prashant Keni as Tejas Shekhar Rajadhyaksh
 Ekta Dangar as Falguni Tejas Rajadhyaksh
 Aniruddha Deodhar as Tanmay Shekhar Rajadhyaksh

Others
 Ajinkya Joshi as Adhokshaj (Banti)
 Shweta Mehendale as Indrani
 Unknown as Anil Mhatre 
 Kiran Rajput as Rekha Mahajan
 Ashwini Mukadam as Lalita Mahajan
 Vandana Marathe as Villager

Reception

Special episode (1 hour) 
 9 October 2022
 27 November 2022
 11 December 2022
 8 January 2023
 12 February 2023
 19 March 2023

Adaptations

References

External links 
 Satvya Mulichi Satavi Mulgi at ZEE5

Marathi-language television shows
2022 Indian television series debuts
Zee Marathi original programming